Stanhopea connata is a species of orchid found in Colombia, Ecuador, and Peru. The flowers range in size from 4.75 - 5.5 in (12 - 14 cm). They're found at altitudes from 1,000 to 2,000 meters, often growing on branches over water.

The flower is commonly known as "the grown-together stanhopea." The flowers are known for their distinctly pungent smell, especially as related to other orchids.

References

External links 

connata
Orchids of Colombia
Orchids of Peru
Taxa named by Johann Friedrich Klotzsch